Kivett & Myers was a Kansas City, Missouri architecture firm that pioneered the design of modern professional sports stadiums.

Clarence Kivett (born Clarence Kivovitch) graduated from the University of Kansas in 1928 and his first big design project was the art deco design of Katz Drug (which was taken over by Osco Drug) at Main Street and Westport in 1934 in Kansas City (which was owned by his uncles Mike and Ike Katz).

He was joined by Ralph Myers in 1940.  They went on to design the Cumonow Residence in Mission Hills, the Missouri State Office Building at 13th and Holmes, the old Temple B'nai Jehudah at 69th and Holmes, Spencer Chemistry and Biological Sciences Building at the University of Missouri–Kansas City and the Fairmount Hotel in the Country Club Plaza and the Mission Hills Country Club clubhouse.

The two most prominent commissions came in the late 1960s and early 1970s with terminals and control tower at Kansas City International Airport (a design layout with in "C" shape so that all gates were within a few feet of the road) and the Truman Sports Complex for Kansas City Chiefs and Kansas City Royals.

A prominent feature of the stadia design favoured by Kivett and Myers is the spiral ramps leading to the higher echelons of seating. This can be seen at Kauffman Stadium and Arrowhead Stadium in Kansas City, as well as the now-demolished Giants Stadium in East Rutherford, New Jersey.

The initial design in 1967 called for the baseball and football stadiums to be built side by side sharing the same parking infrastructure as well as a rolling roof that was to slide from one stadium to the other.  The concepts of separate stadiums for baseball and football was revolutionary at the time when stadiums were designed as gigantic multipurpose venues.  The rolling roof was initially too expensive and too impractical in Kansas City however it was to be applied at several stadiums elsewhere in the decades that followed.

In 1978 the Kansas City civil engineering and architecture firm HNTB acquired Kivett and Myers and went on to build several professional stadiums, indoor arenas, and ballparks.  Several of the firm's architects also went on to open a sports architecture office in Kansas City for HOK in 1983, now the independent firm of Populous, with offices in Kansas City, London, and Brisbane.  In 1988 several more architects left HNTB and opened a sports architecture office in Kansas City for Ellerbe Becket (since acquired by AECOM). This practice was known primarily for professional indoor sports arenas, but was also responsible for several major stadia.

References

External links
KC Public Library History
Kansas City Biz Journal profile

Architecture firms based in Missouri
Companies based in Kansas City, Missouri